The Cook County, Illinois, general election was held on November 4, 1986.

Primaries were held March 18, 1986.

Elections were held for the offices of Assessor, Clerk, Sheriff, State's Attorney, Superintendent of Education Service Region, Treasurer, President of the Cook County Board of Commissioners, all 17 seats of the Cook County Board of Commissioners, both seats of the Cook County Board of Appeals, 3 seats on the Water Reclamation District Board, and judgeships on the Circuit Court of Cook County.

Election information
1986 was a midterm election year in the United States. The primaries and general elections for Cook County races coincided with those for federal (Senate and House) and those for state elections.

Voter turnout

Primary election

General election
The general election saw turnout of 55.95%, with 1,476,370 ballots cast. Chicago saw 841,085 ballots cast, and suburban Cook County saw 635,2865 ballots cast.

Straight-ticket voting
Ballots had a straight-ticket voting option in 1986.

Assessor 

In the 1986 Cook County Assessor election, incumbent third-term assessor Thomas Hynes, a Democrat, was reelected.

Primaries

Democratic

Republican
By winning the Republican nomination, Le Roy M. Graham became the first black candidate to run countywide as a Republican nominee.

General election

Clerk 

In the 1986 Cook County Clerk election, incumbent third-term clerk Stanley Kusper, a Democrat, was reelected.

Primaries

Democratic
Incumbent Stanley Kusper defeated two challengers to win renomination.

The more successful of Kusper's two challengers was Jeanne Quinn, who four years earlier had become the first Democrat to be elected to the Cook County Board of Commissioners from suburban Cook County in half a century. Instead of seeking reelection, she instead opted to launch a challenge to Kusper. Kusper's other challenger was 28-year-old millionaire businessman Patrick M. Finley.

Republican
Former Illinois state representative Diana Nelson won the Republican primary.

General election

Sheriff 

In the 1986 Cook County Sheriff election, incumbent fourth-term sheriff Richard Elrod, a Democrat, was defeated by Republican James E. O'Grady.

O'Grady became the first Republican elected to a countywide executive office in Cook County since Bernard Carey was elected to his final term as Cook County State's Attorney in 1976.

Primaries

Democratic

Republican

General election
O'Grady won the endorsement of the Chicago Tribune for the general election.

O'Grady's victory came from winning the county's suburbs by a 2-1 margin. He also performed well in some of the ethnically white wards of Chicago, being able to cary 14 of the city's 50 wards.

Superintendent of Education Service Region 

In the 1986 Cook County Superintendent of Education Service Region election, incumbent third-term superintendent Richard J. Martwick, a Democrat, was reelected.

Primaries

Democratic

Republican
No candidate ran in the Republican primary. The Republican Party ultimately nominated Tony Torres.

General election

Treasurer 

In the 1986 Cook County Treasurer election, incumbent third-term treasurer Edward J. Rosewell, a Democrat, was reelected.

Primaries

Democratic

Republican

General election

President of the Cook County Board of Commissioners 

In the 1986 President of the Cook County Board of Commissioners election, incumbent president George Dunne, a Democrat that had held the office since 1969, was reelected.

Primaries

Democratic

Republican

General election

Cook County Board of Commissioners 

The 1986 Cook County Board of Commissioners election saw all seventeen seats of the Cook County Board of Commissioners up for election to four-year terms in two sets of elections (ten elected from an election held in the city of Chicago and seven elected from and election held in suburban Cook County).

Democrats lost a seat, and Republicans, conversely, gained a seat.

City of Chicago
Ten seats were elected from the City of Chicago.

Primaries

Democratic

Republican

General election

Suburban Cook County

Primaries

Democratic

Republican

General election
Republican nominee Bernard Carey was replaced on the ballot by Robert P. Gooley, as Carey opted to instead run for Illinois Attorney General, replacing James T. Ryan as the Republican nominee for that election.

Cook County Board of Appeals 

In the 1986 Cook County Board of Appeals election, both seats on the board were up for election. The election was an at-large election.

One incumbent Democrat, Pat Quinn, did not seek reelection, instead running for Illinois Treasurer. The other incumbent Democrat, Harry H. Semrow, sought reelection.

Primaries

Democratic

Republican

General election

Water Reclamation District Board 

In the 1986 Metropolitan Water Reclamation District of Greater Chicago election, three of the nine seats on the Metropolitan Water Reclamation District of Greater Chicago board were up for election in an at-large election. All three Democratic nominees won.

Judicial elections
Partisan elections were held for judgeships on the Circuit Court of Cook County, due to vacancies. Other judgeships had retention elections.

Other elections
Coinciding with the primaries, elections were held to elect both the Democratic and Republican committeemen for the suburban townships.

See also 
 1986 Illinois elections

References 

Cook County
Cook County, Illinois elections
Cook County 1986
Cook County
Cook County, Illinois elections